Nawell Madani (born 1983 in Watermael-Boitsfort, Belgium) is a Belgian humorist of Algerian descent, presenter and producer. She became famous in 2012 because of the Jamel Comedy Club.

Biography
Born on 25 October 1983, Nawell grew up in Belgium, suffered third-degree burns at the age of 2, and was a tomboy for most of her childhood and adolescence. Her father is a taxi driver.

She moved to Paris at the age of 21, at first with the ambition to become a professional choreographer and dancer, returned to Belgium, and left again. After several tours as a choreographer, she gave up this career: "the artistic directors asked us to wear a bikini. They don’t give a damn about the dance", she declared. She was briefly an artistic director of a nightclub in Antwerp. She discovered the theatre and wanted to become an actress. At the end of 2008, she joined the Studio Pygmalion where she trained for a few months. She also followed courses taught by Damien Acoca, and those of the “Laboratory of the Actor” directed by Hélène Zidi-Chéruy. This was how she was spotted in a small room, The Pranzo, by the artistic director of the Jamel Comedy Club who invited her to a casting to join the team created by Jamel Debbouze. Madani was the only woman to join the team. In September 2011 she began her career as a comedian. She left this troupe six months later: "I thought to join a big family, I discovered a world full of ego and competition".

On Télé Sud, she hosted the programme Backstage, where she received artists such as Rick Ross, Shaggy, Wyclef Jean, Kery James, Nas and Chris Brown. In 2011, she presented the programme Shake Your Body on MTV with Cut Killer. In September 2012, she joined as a commentator the team of Grand Journal which was being renewed. In 2013, she founded the collective Jam’Girls, a television programme which met a new generation of female comedians, broadcast on Chérie 25 and Comédie. In 2014 she went for her first one-woman show, C'est moi la plus belge ("I am more Belgian"), in the Palais des Glaces in Paris and did the tour of the Zeniths in France. She talked about taboo subjects, such as the virginity of North African women, or homosexuality. She took a place in the festival Juste pour rire of Montreal in July 2014.

In 2015, she won Best One-Man Show in the Globe de Cristal Awards.

Filmography

References

1983 births
Living people
Belgian film actresses
Belgian humorists
Belgian people of Algerian descent
Belgian television presenters
Women humorists
Belgian women television presenters